The Prodigal is a 1983 film directed by James F. Collier. It is a retelling of the story of the prodigal son and stars John Hammond, Hope Lange, John Cullum, Morgan Brittany, Ian Bannen, Joey Travolta, and Arliss Howard.

References

External links
 
 

1983 films
1983 drama films